In Classical architecture a term or terminal figure (plural: terms or termini) is a human head and bust that continues as a square  tapering pillar-like form. Some may appear similar to a herma.

In the architecture and the painted architectural decoration of the European Renaissance and the succeeding Classical styles, term figures are quite common. Often they represent minor deities associated with fields and vineyards and the edges of woodland, Pan and fauns and Bacchantes especially, and they may be draped with garlands of fruit and flowers.

Term figures were a particularly characteristic feature of the 16th-century style in furniture and carved interior decoration that is called Antwerp Mannerism. Engravings disseminated the style through Germany and England.

References 

 Cyril M. Harris (1977). Illustrated Dictionary of Historic Architecture. Courier Dover Publications, ; p. 528

External links 

 
 Pair of terminal statuettes (The Metropolitan Museum)
 Terminus / Term / Terminal figure (Buffalo Architecture Index)

Columns and entablature
Architectural elements
Architectural history
Ancient Roman sculpture
Sculpture
Ornaments (architecture)